Colonel Edward Aldrich (30 December 1802 – 23 November 1857) was a British military engineer, architect and surveyor of the Corps of Royal Engineers who carried out the first detailed survey of Palestine together with John Symonds, RE.

Career 
Aldrich was specially employed in command in Spain, Syria, and Hong Kong, China.

During the Carlist War in Spain in 1839, he was employed in obtaining the Carlist surrender of Melilla fortress to the Queen of Spain.

In Syria, Aldrich commanded the Royal Engineers from the first landing on 11 September 1840 to the 12 December—operations at Djouni, Tyre; bombardment and assault of Sidon; bombardment and capture of Beirut, and subsequent surrender to him, while in charge of detachments of Royal Marines and Turkish troops, of a division of the Egyptian Army (3000) with their encampment and 24 pieces of artillery; the bombardment and capture of Acre. From 13 December he was employed on the Staff in the advance to Jaffa and from 30 September 1841 as Commanding Royal Engineer until the evacuation of Syria by British troops. For his efforts he received the Naval General Service Medal (1847), 'Syria' clasp.

He was assigned to China as the first Commanding Royal Engineer to Hong Kong, from 1843 until withdrawal in 1846–1847. In April 1847 he took part in the combined naval and military expedition to Canton, up the Canton River, charged in command with the assault and capture of seven forts—Whampoa Creek, French Folly, Ronge, Zig-zag, Segment and Shanneen Forts.

Aldrich died at age 57 at Marylebone, London. Aldrich Bay, on the north shore on the Hong Kong Island, is named after him.

Bibliography

Publications

References 

Royal Engineers officers
British surveyors
1802 births
1857 deaths
British military personnel of the Egyptian–Ottoman War (1839–1841)
People of the First Carlist War